Jaelin Charlotte Kauf (born September 26, 1996) is an American freestyle skier who competes internationally. She competed at the 2018 and 2022 Winter Olympics in women's moguls.

Career
She competed for the United States at the FIS Freestyle Ski and Snowboarding World Championships 2017 in Sierra Nevada, Spain, where she won a bronze medal in dual moguls. She won a silver at the 2019 World Championships in dual moguls.

Rank No. 1 in the world going in, Kauf qualified for the 2018 Winter Olympics in Pyeongchang, South Korea where she was among the favorites to medal. However, she finished seventh there and did not make the medal final.

Representing Team USA at the 2022 Beijing Winter Olympics, Kauf won the silver medal in Olympic freestyle moguls.

References

External links

1996 births
Living people
American female freestyle skiers
Freestyle skiers at the 2018 Winter Olympics
Freestyle skiers at the 2022 Winter Olympics
Medalists at the 2022 Winter Olympics
Olympic silver medalists for the United States in freestyle skiing
21st-century American women
Sportspeople from Wyoming
People from Teton County, Wyoming